Flat Creek is an unincorporated community in Buncombe County, North Carolina, United States,  located along Old Mars Hill Highway (SR 2207), near the Future I-26/US 19/US 23 interchange (exit 15).  The community is named after Flat Creek, a tributary of the French Broad River.

References

Unincorporated communities in Buncombe County, North Carolina
Unincorporated communities in North Carolina